Liaqat Khan Tarakai is a Pakistani politician who is currently a member of Senate of Pakistan representing Pakistan Tehreek-e-Insaf.

Early life 
Liaqat Khan Tarakai was born in Tarakai House of Razar Tehsil,  Swabi district, Khyber Pakhtunkhwa.

Political career

He was elected to the Senate of Pakistan as a candidate of Pakistan Tehreek-e-Insaf in 2015 Pakistani Senate election.

References

Living people
Pakistani senators (14th Parliament)
Pakistani Muslims
Pakistan Tehreek-e-Insaf politicians
People from Swabi District
Year of birth missing (living people)